John Robert "Chick" Webster (November 3, 1920 – January 18, 2018) was a professional ice hockey player who played 14 games in the National Hockey League. Prior to this, he was a soldier in World War II.

Biography
Born in Toronto, Ontario, Webster played with the New York Rangers during the 1949-50 season. His brother, Don Webster, also played briefly in the NHL, appearing in 27 games for the Toronto Maple Leafs. During World War II, he was a forward observer and gunner for the 13th Field Regiment of the 3rd Canadian Division. He served in Germany, Holland, England, France and the North Sea.

Webster lived in Richmond Hill, Ontario, during his time with the Stouffville Clippers in 1960s, and afterward lived in Mattawa, Ontario. After Milt Schmidt's death in January 2017, he became the oldest living former NHL player. His wife, Leona, died in 2009 of Alzheimer's disease. He died at home in Mattawa on January 18, 2018, at the age of 97. His nickname, Chick, was given to him in his playing days for his love for chewing Chiclets gum.

Career statistics

References

External links
 

1920 births
2018 deaths
Baltimore Clippers (1945–49) players
Baltimore Orioles (ice hockey) players
Canadian Army personnel of World War II
Canadian Army soldiers
Canadian expatriate ice hockey players in the United States
Canadian ice hockey centres
Military personnel from Toronto
New York Rangers players
New York Rovers players
Royal Regiment of Canadian Artillery personnel
Ice hockey people from Toronto